Wan Wan is a Taiwanese comics artist, blogger, illustrator and actress.

One of the most well-known online illustrator in Taiwan. She is also the very first blogger who participate in commercial advertisement and movie “You are the Apple of My Eye”.

Career
 2004 Debuts by creating her stories based on daily office work, implement it into MSN Live Messenger icons. Soon becomes the first blogger with more than billion views.
 2005 First Book “Wan Wan's Doodle Diary: My Dull Work” sold more than 50,000 copies in first two weeks.
 Winner of China Time Blogger Award
 Winner of Kingstone Person of the year
 Collaborated Family Mart in sticker collecting for Wan Wan's special magnet sets, total of  50 million sets of promos being distributed, Family Mart made more billion dollars of revenues from this collaboration.
 2006 Winner of 2nd China Time Blogger Award for Humor and Fun
 2007 Winner of Best Illustrator by “Better Life Monthly”
 2009 Winner of Yahoo! Most Popular Blogger Rewards
 2010 EU Goodwill Ambassador and publish “Wan Wan's Travel Journal 2 :Let's go to Europe”.
 2010 Supporting Role in Giddens Ko's movie, “You are the Apple of My Eye”.
 2011 “Happiness- Here I come ! Wan Wan's 20 joyful ideas” being selected as 10th and 11th Best Book of the Year by Hong Kong Reading City
 2013 First illustrator launched her own LINE Sticker and Line Camera Stamp Sticker. Until 2013 Collaborated with Zespri Kiwifruit of commercial Line Sticker, more than 6 million downloads, later they launched 2  more collections
 2014 Winner of Outstanding Blogger rewarded by PIXNET.
 Join work with singer Yang Cheng Lin at 2008 publish “Fun Fun: That is how we met” and celebrity Kevin Tsai in 2014 published “Kevin Tsai's Way of Speaking 2” (as Illustrator).
 2014 First Taiwan illustrator launched her own paid Line Sticker.
 2018 Total 11 paid Line stickers, accumulated more than 100 million downloads.

Works

Filmography

Film

References

External links

 
 

1981 births
21st-century Taiwanese actresses
Living people